Guelph, North Dakota is an unincorporated community located in Dickey County in southeastern North Dakota, United States. Founded in 1886 as a station for the Great Northern Railway, it was built close to the James River. The post office of the town was established on March 8, 1887, and its postmaster, Silas R. Dales, named the town for his hometown of Guelph, Ontario.

Source
Dickey County

Unincorporated communities in North Dakota
Unincorporated communities in Dickey County, North Dakota
Populated places established in 1886
1886 establishments in Dakota Territory